Klaus Bednarz (6 June 1942 – 14 April 2015) was a German journalist and writer.

Life 
Bednarz was born in Falkensee, Province of Brandenburg. He studied Slavic studies, theatre and Eastern European history at universities in Hamburg, Vienna and Moscow. His dissertation at university was on Russian author Anton Chekhov. Since 1967 Bednarz worked for German television as correspondent in Poland (1971–1977) and in the Soviet Union (1977–1982). Later he was television presenter of the German TV programme Monitor, broadcast by Westdeutscher Rundfunk. During these years Bednarz wrote several books on Eastern European countries and the south of South America. He died in Schwerin, Mecklenburg-Vorpommern.

Works

Books

 1977: Poland
 1979: The old Moscow
 1980: Heinrich Böll and Lew Kopelew in discussion with Klaus Bednarz
 1984: Masuren
 1985: My Moscow
 1989: Poland
 1990: Travelguide Moscow
 1990: Gorbachev
 1992: Russia
 1995: Far near country – Meetings in Ostpreußen
 1997: About authors and books
 1998: The Ballad of Lake Baikal
 2002: East from sun – From Lake Baikal to Alaska
 2004: At the end of the world – Journey through Tierra del Fuego and Patagonia
 2006: My Russia
 2007: The cross of North. Journey through Karelien
 2009: Far and near: About my life as journalist

Awards 
 1982 and 1985: Adolf-Grimme-Preis
 1986:  Award
 1987: BUND journalists award
 1988: Carl von Ossietzky Medal
 1991: Goldene Kamera in category Best news speaker for 
 1992: Deutscher Kritikerpreis
 1993: Civis media prize
 1995: Telestar "Best reporter documentation/news" for Die Reise nach Ostpreußen
 1999: DUH 
 2003: Gold medaille by international film- and TV festival Jalta

References

External links

biographiy from Klaus Bednarz at whoswho.de

1942 births
2015 deaths
People from Havelland
People from the Province of Brandenburg
German male journalists
German male writers
20th-century German journalists
21st-century German journalists
German television presenters
German television journalists
German broadcast news analysts
ARD (broadcaster) people
Westdeutscher Rundfunk people